The Orchestre Lamoureux officially known as the Société des Nouveaux-Concerts and also known as the Concerts Lamoureux) is an orchestral concert society which once gave weekly concerts by its own orchestra, founded in Paris by Charles Lamoureux in 1881.  It has played an important role in French musical life, including giving the premieres of Emmanuel Chabrier's España (1883), Gabriel Fauré's Pavane (1888), Claude Debussy's Nocturnes (1900 and 1901) and La mer (1905), Maurice Ravel's Menuet antique (1930) and Piano Concerto in G major (1932).

Principal conductors
Charles Lamoureux (1881–1897)
Camille Chevillard (1897–1923)
Paul Paray (1923–1928)
Albert Wolff (1928–1934)
Eugène Bigot (1935–1950) 
Jean Martinon (1951–1957)
Igor Markevitch (1957–1961)
Jean-Baptiste Mari 
Jean Claude Bernède (1979–1991)
Valentin Kojin (1991–1993)
Yutaka Sado (1993–2011)
Fayçal Karoui (2011–present)

References

External links
Homepage
Article

French orchestras
Musical groups established in 1881
1881 establishments in France
Musical groups from Paris
Erato Records artists